In 1956, Anthony F. C. Wallace published a paper called "Revitalization Movements" to describe how cultures change themselves.   A revitalization movement is a "deliberate, organized, conscious effort by members of a society to construct a more satisfying culture" (p. 265), and Wallace describes at length the processes by which a revitalization movement takes place.

Overview
Wallace' model 1956 describes the process of a revitalization movement. It is derived from studies of a Native American religious movement, The Code of Handsome Lake, which may have led to the formation of the Longhouse Religion. 

Wallace derived his theory from studies of so-called primitive peoples (preliterate and homogeneous), with particular attention to the Iroquois revitalization movement led by Seneca religious leader and prophet Handsome Lake (1735-1815). Wallace believed that his revitalization model applies to movements as broad and complex as the rise of Christianity, Islam, Buddhism, or Wesleyan Methodism.

Revitalizaton is a part of social movements.

Scholars such as Vittorio Lanternari (1963) and Peter Worsley (1968) have developed and adapted Wallace's insights.

See also
Ghost Dance: a famous Native American revitalization movement
Great Awakenings: a controversially named reference to revitalization movements in the USA.
Revivalism

Notes

References
 Kehoe, B Alice, The Ghost Dance: Ethnohistory and Revitalization, Massacre at Wounded Knee Creek,  Thompson Publishing, 1989.  
 Vittorio Lanternari. The Religions of the Oppressed; a Study of Modern Messianic Cults. (London: MacGibbon & Kee, [Studies in Society],  1963; New York: Knopf, 1963).
 Peter Worsley. The Trumpet Shall Sound; a Study of "Cargo" Cults in Melanesia. (New York,: Schocken Books,  2d augmented,  1968).
 Lamont Lindstrom. Cargo Cult: Strange Stories of Desire from Melanesia and Beynd. (Honolulu: University of Hawaii Press. 1993).

Anthropology
Social movements
Sociology of religion